Lethbridge School Division is the public school board in Lethbridge, Alberta, Canada.

Size
Lethbridge School Division operates 24 schools covering grades ranging from Pre-Kindergarten  to Grade 12.

Governance
A group of seven elected trustees run the Lethbridge School Division.  They are elected every three years, in the regular municipal election.  In the election, Lethbridge voters can only vote for a trustee to one (not both) of the two major school boards (Lethbridge School Division and the separate Holy Spirit Roman Catholic division).  The public and Catholic systems operate independently of each other, and are both under the direct authority of the provincial government of Alberta. The last election was in October 2021.

List of schools and principals
High schools

 Chinook High School (Bill Forster)
 Lethbridge Collegiate Institute (Wayne Pallet)
 Winston Churchill High School (Tracy Wong)
 Victoria Park High School (Cayley King)
 Immanuel Christian High School

Middle schools

 Gilbert Paterson Middle School (Darryl Christiansen)
 G.S. Lakie Middle School (Sharon Mezei)
 Lethbridge Christian School (Sean Alaric)
 Senator Joyce Fairbairn Middle School (Bill Bartlett)
 Wilson Middle School (Dean Hawkins)

Elementary schools

 Coalbanks Elementary School (Joey Gentile)
 Dr. Gerald B. Probe Elementary School (Candice Vercillo)
 École Agnes Davidson Elementary School (Broc Higginson)
 Fleetwood Bawden Elementary School (Craig DeJong)
 Galbraith Elementary School (Sandy Scheldrup)
 General Stewart Elementary School
 Lakeview Elementary School
 Lethbridge Christian School (Sean Alaric)
 Mike Mountain Horse Elementary School
 Nicholas Sheran Community School (Deborah Constable)
 Park Meadows Elementary School (Mark Blankenstyn)
 Senator Buchanan Elementary School
 Westminster Elementary School (Angela Wilde)
 Immanuel Christian Elementary School

See also
List of Alberta school boards
Schools in Alberta
Holy Spirit Roman Catholic Separate Regional Division No. 4

External links
 Lethbridge School District No. 51

School districts in Alberta
Education in Lethbridge